Olous or Olus (or ) was a city of ancient Crete; now sunken, it was situated at the present day town of Elounda, Crete, Greece. According to the Stadiasmus Maris Magni, it had a harbour and was located 260 stadia from Chersonasus and 15 stadia from Camara.

History
After continuing boundary disputes with the hillfort of Lato, the citizens of Olous eventually entered into a treaty with those of Lato. There was a temple to Britomartis in the city, a wooden statue of whom was erected by Daedalus, the mythical ancestor of the Daedalidae, and father of Cretan art. Her effigy is represented on the coins of Olous.

Present conditions
Archaeologists discovered ancient texts within the ruins linking the town with the ancient cities of Knossos and the island of Rhodes. The sunken city can be visited by tourists swimming in Elounda Bay. Today, the only visible remnants of the city are some scattered wall bases.

See also 
 List of ancient Greek cities

Notes

References

Tourist site of the Spina Longa area

Submerged places
Underwater ruins
Ruins in Greece
Cretan city-states
Ancient Greek archaeological sites in Crete
Geography of Crete
Populated places in ancient Crete
Former populated places in Greece